Daer ales is a species of beetle in the family Carabidae, the only species in the genus Daer.

References

Lebiinae
Beetles described in 1929